Stop for a Minute may refer to:

 "Stop for a Minute" (Keane song), featuring K'naan, 2010
 "Stop for a Minute" (Polish Club song), 2021
 "Stop for a Minute" (Sandra song), 1988